Eaton railway station was a station in Eaton, Bishop's Castle, Shropshire, England. The station was opened in March 1866 and closed on 20 April 1935.

References

Further reading

Disused railway stations in Shropshire
Railway stations in Great Britain opened in 1866
Railway stations in Great Britain closed in 1935